Sagar Assembly constituency may refer to 
 Sagar, Karnataka Assembly constituency
 Sagar, Madhya Pradesh Assembly constituency
 Sagar, West Bengal Assembly constituency